In Greek mythology Plouto may refer to:

Pluto (mythology), another name for Hades, the god of the Underworld
Plouto (mother of Tantalus), the mother of Tantalus
Plouto (Oceanid), one of the daughters of Oceanus and Tethys